Kashmir Day may refer to :
 Kashmir Solidarity Day (February 5), a national day in Pakistan
 Kashmir Martyrs' Day (July 13), a commemoration of the massacres of 1931